is a Japanese speed skater. He competed in the men's 1000 metres event at the 2010 Winter Olympics.

References

1983 births
Living people
Japanese male speed skaters
Olympic speed skaters of Japan
Speed skaters at the 2010 Winter Olympics
Sportspeople from Hokkaido
Speed skaters at the 2003 Asian Winter Games
21st-century Japanese people